Hednota longipalpella, the pasture webworm,  is a moth species of the family Crambidae. It is found in most of mainland Australia.

References

Crambinae
Moths of Australia
Moths described in 1879